Yingda International Trust Co., Ltd. is a Chinese trust company and asset management firm that was majority owned by State Grid Corporation of China (via State Grid Yingda Group for 89.76% stake). Yingda Trust was founded in March 1987, as Jinan International Trust and Investment Corporation. Yingda Trust owned Yingda Asset Management for 49% stake. The company was headquartered in Jinan, but in 2010 moved to Beijing.

Shareholders

 State Grid Corporation of China (via State Grid Yingda Group and its subsidiary, via State Grid Shanghai): 93.60%
 Jinan Development and Reform Commission (via indirect subsidiary Jinan Energy Investment): 4.38%
 Jigang Group: 1.10%
: 0.92%

Yingda Group also acquired 4.67% stake from sister company East China Grid on 27 March 2012 and from Jinan 3F in 2013.

See also
 Shandong International Trust

References

External links
  

State Grid Corporation of China
Financial services companies of China
Private equity firms of China
Companies based in Beijing
Companies based in Jinan
Chinese companies established in 1987
Government-owned companies of China